Palama Settlement is a nonprofit social service agency located in Honolulu, Hawaii that was established in 1896. It currently serves the Kalihi and Kāpalama neighborhoods of Honolulu.

History 
In September 1941, Palama hosted future baseball star Jackie Robinson when he was playing professional football for the Honolulu Bears, as he was not allowed to stay at regular hotels with his white teammates.  

In palama, the school that would become the first Kajukenbo school was Made.

References

External links 

 
 The Progressive Era and Hawai'i: The Early History of Palama Settlement, 1896—1929, by Warren S. Nishimoto,  Hawaiian Journal of History, https://core.ac.uk/download/pdf/5014399.pdf

Non-profit organizations based in Hawaii
Humanitarian aid organizations
Pre-statehood history of Hawaii
Republic of Hawaii